Zhou Zuoren (16 January 1885 – 6 May 1967) was a Chinese writer, primarily known as an essayist and a translator. He was the younger brother of Lu Xun (Zhou Shuren, 周树人), the second of three brothers.

Biography

Early life

Born in Shaoxing, Zhejiang, he was educated at the Jiangnan Naval Academy as a teenager. Following the steps of his brother Lu Xun, he left for Japan to pursue his studies in 1906. During his stint in Japan, he began studying Ancient Greek, with the aim of translating the Gospels into Classical Chinese, and attended lectures on Chinese philology by scholar-revolutionary Zhang Binglin at Rikkyo University, although he was supposed to study civil engineering there. He returned to China in 1911, with his Japanese wife, and began to teach in different institutions.

During the May Fourth Movement

Writing essays in vernacular Chinese for the influential magazine La Jeunesse, Zhou was a key figure in the May Fourth Movement as well as the New Culture Movement. He was an advocate of literary reform. In a 1918 article, he called for a "humanist literature" in which "any custom or rule that goes against human instincts and nature should be rejected or rectified". As examples, he cited children sacrificing themselves for their parents and wives being buried alive to accompany their dead husbands. Zhou's ideal literature was both democratic and individualistic. On the other hand, Zhou made a distinction between "democratic" and "popular" literature. Common people may understand the latter, but not the former. This implies a difference between common people and the elite. Zhou condemned elite traditional performances like the Beijing opera. He called it "disgusting," "nauseating," "pretentious" and referred to the singing as "a weird inhuman sound."

His short essays, with their refreshing style, won him many readers up to the present day. An avid reader, he called his studies "miscellanies", and penned an essay titled "My Miscellaneous Studies" (我的雜學). He was particularly interested in folklore, anthropology and natural history. One of his favorite writers was Havelock Ellis. He was also a prolific translator, producing translations of classical Greek and classical Japanese literatures. Most of his translations are pioneering, which include a collection of Greek mimes, Sappho's lyrics, Euripides' tragedies, Kojiki, Shikitei Sanba's Ukiyoburo, Sei Shōnagon's Makura no Sōshi and a collection of Kyogen. He considered his translation of Lucian's Dialogues, which he finished late in his life, as his greatest literary achievement. He was also the first one to translate (from English) the story Ali Baba into Chinese (known as Xianü Nu 俠女奴). During the 1930s he was also a regular contributor to Lin Yutang's humor magazine The Analects Fortnightly and wrote extensively about China's traditions of humor, satire, parody, and joking, even compiling a collection of Jokes from the Bitter Tea Studio (Kucha'an xiaohua ji).<ref>Christopher Rea, The Age of Irreverence: A New History of Laughter in China (Oakland, CA: University of California Press, 2015), chapters 2 and 6.</ref> He became chancellor of Beijing University in 1939.

Later life

In 1945, after the Second Sino-Japanese War, Zhou was arrested for treason by the Nationalist government of Chiang Kai-shek, stemming from his alleged collaboration with the Wang Jingwei government during the Japanese occupation of north China. Zhou was sentenced to 14 years in Nanjing Prison, but was released in 1949 by the Communist government after a pardon. Later that year he returned to Beijing. He continued to write and translate, but published his works under pseudonyms. He died during the Cultural Revolution. During the first decades of the People's Republic of China, Zhou Zuoren's writings were not widely available to readers due to his alleged collaboration. Only during the relatively liberal 1980s did his works become available again. The Chinese scholar Qian Liqun 錢理群 in 2001 published an extensive biography of Zhou Zuoren entitled "Biography of Zhou Zuoren" 周作人传.

References

Bibliography

A great number of books about Zhou Zuoren are published in Chinese every year. For basic information about his life and works, see:
Zhang Juxiang 张菊香 and Zhang Tierong 张铁荣 (eds.) (1986). Zhou Zuoren yanjiu ziliao (周作人硏究资料　"Materials for the study of Zhou Zuoren"). 2 volumes. Tianjin: Tianjin renmin chubanshe.
A character portrait by a contemporary colleague at Peking University:
 Wen Yuan-ning (1934). "Chou Tso-jen: Iron and Grace," in Imperfect Understanding: Intimate Portraits of Modern Chinese Celebrities. Edited by Christopher Rea (Amherst, MA: Cambria Press, 2018), pp. 49–52.
For Western language studies, see:
Daruvala, Susan (2000). Zhou Zuoren and An Alternative Chinese Response to Modernity. Cambridge, Mass.: Harvard University Asia Center.
Georges Bê Duc (2010). Zhou Zuoren et l'essai chinois moderne. Paris: L'Harmattan.
Comprehensive editions of his works and translations include:
Zhi'an 止庵 (ed.) (2002). Zhou Zuoren zibian wenji (周作人自编文集 "Zho Zuroen's essays as arranged by himself"). 34 volumes. Shijiazhuang: Hebei jiaoyu chubanshe.
Zhong Shuhe 钟叔河 (ed.) (1998). Zhou Zuoren wen leibian (周作人文类编 "Zhou Zuoren's essays as arranged by subject matter"). 10 volumes. Changsha: Hunan wenyi chubanshe.
Zhou Zhouren (1999–). Kuyuzhai yicong (苦雨斋译丛 "Translations done at the Studio of Uninterrupted Rain"). 12 volumes have appeared. Beijing: Zhongguo duiwai fanyi chuban gongsi.
Some of his essays are available in English:
Pollard, David (trans.) (2006).  Zhou Zuoren, Selected Essays. Chinese-English bilingual edition. Hong Kong: Chinese University Press.

Further reading
 Chinese Writers on Writing'' featuring Zhou Zuoren. Ed. Arthur Sze. (Trinity University Press, 2010).

External links

A more comprehensive bibliography of English translations of Zhou's writing can be found in the Modern Chinese Literature and Culture resource centre.

1885 births
1967 deaths
Chinese expatriates in Japan
Translators from Greek
Translators from Japanese
Translators to Chinese
Chinese folklorists
Chinese collaborators with Imperial Japan
People's Republic of China essayists
Republic of China essayists
Writers from Shaoxing
Republic of China translators
People's Republic of China translators
20th-century Chinese translators
Rikkyo University alumni
Chinese Esperantists
Lu Xun
20th-century essayists